The Mexico women's national water polo team is the representative for Mexico in international women's water polo.

References

Water polo
Women's national water polo teams
Women's water polo in Mexico